Cadeby is a village and civil parish in the Metropolitan Borough of Doncaster in South Yorkshire, England. The population at the census of 2011 was 203. It is about five miles west of Doncaster, and four miles east of Mexborough.

History
The manor of Cadeby was held in medieval times by the Norman baronial Fitzwilliam family, and later by their descendants, the Copley baronets. Later, it was inherited by barrister Thomas Levett, a native of High Melton, who sold to his brother, York barrister John Levett, who in turn sold it to Edmund Hastings, Esq., of Plumtree, Nottinghamshire.

Cadeby Quarry
Close to the village is Cadeby Quarry, a site of special scientific interest, which was notified in 1977 for its geological interest. The site covers 240 acres (97 hectares) of the old quarry. It is one of 35 sites of special scientific interest in South Yorkshire.

See also
Listed buildings in Cadeby, South Yorkshire
St John the Evangelist's Church, Cadeby
Cadeby Main Colliery

References

External links

Villages in Doncaster
Civil parishes in South Yorkshire